The Francis Scott Key Monument is an outdoor sculpture to Francis Scott Key in Baltimore, Maryland.

History
Charles Marburg gave $25,000 to his brother Theodore Marburg to hire a sculptor  to create a monument to Francis Scott Key. The French sculptor Antonin Mercié was selected. Mercié had previously created a bronze equestrian statue of Robert E. Lee in 1890 in Richmond, Virginia. The sculpture was dedicated on Eutaw Place in 1911.

The sculpture was restored and rededicated on September 11, 1999.

The statue was defaced with the words "Racist Anthem", and covered in red paint in September of 2017. The city quickly restored the monument, and it now sits behind chain link fencing.

Gallery

See also
List of public art in Baltimore
Orpheus with the Awkward Foot
The works of Antonin Mercié

References

1911 sculptures
Outdoor sculptures in Baltimore
Vandalized works of art in Maryland
Monument